Portillo is a surname of Castilian origin, specifically San Vicente de la Barquera in Santander, Spain.

Portillo literally means "small port", from Latin portus.

In the UK, the most famous bearer of this surname is Michael Portillo, a British politician and broadcaster of Spanish and Scottish descent.

Popularity
Currently in Spain there are 6,554 persons using Portillo as last name. It is the 725th most common surname in Spain.

Persons named Portillo in Spain by province:

People with this name
Álex Portillo (born 1992), Spanish footballer
Alfonso Portillo (born 1951), Guatemalan ex-president
Alonso Hernández del Portillo (1543–1624), Spanish historian
Blanca Portillo (born 1963), Spanish actress
César Portillo (born 1968), Venezuelan basketball player
Chantal Portillo (born 1957), French writer
Dick Portillo, founder of Portillo's Restaurants
Edwin Portillo (born 1962), Salvadoran footballer and manager
Gabe Portillo, American bass player for P.O.D
Isaac Portillo (born 1994), Salvadoran footballer
Javier G. Portillo (born 1982), Spanish footballer
Jesús Portillo (born 1999), Argentine footballer 
José López Portillo (1920-2004), former President of Mexico 
Lourdes Portillo (born 1944), Chicana film-maker
Luis Gabriel Portillo (1907-1993), Professor, politician, exile and writer
María Portillo (born 1972), Peruvian marathon runner
María Portillo Ramírez (born 1999), Mexican tennis player
Michael Portillo (born 1953), British television presenter, former politician 
Miguel Alfredo Portillo (born 1982), Argentine footballer
Pablo Portillo (born 1984), Mexican singer
Patricia Portillo (born 1974), Spanish freestyle skier.
Rafael Portillo (1916–1995), Mexican filmmaker
Samuel Portillo (born 1994), Argentine-Paraguayan footballer 
Sergio Portillo (born 1955), Venezuelan/American painter and sculptor
Veronica Portillo (born 1977), American reality show contestant

See also
Portillo (disambiguation)

External links
http://www.spiegel.de/panorama/leute/kuenstler-sergio-portillo-macht-kunst-aus-asche-verstorbener-a-887770.html
Surnames
Surnames of Spanish origin
Spanish-language surnames